John and Minerva Kline Farm, also known as Kline Farmstead, is a historic home and farm and national historic district located in Union Township, Huntington County, Indiana. The farmhouse was built in 1865, and is a two-story, five bay, Greek Revival style brick I-house with a -story rear ell.  It has a slate gable roof and small wooden front porch with square posts and pilasters.  Also on the property the contributing summer house (c. 1865), tenant house, English barn, drive-in crib barn, pump house, livestock barn, chicken house, and a variety of landscape features.

It was listed on the National Register of Historic Places in 1988.

References

Historic districts on the National Register of Historic Places in Indiana
Farms on the National Register of Historic Places in Indiana
Greek Revival houses in Indiana
Houses completed in 1865
Historic districts in Huntington County, Indiana
National Register of Historic Places in Huntington County, Indiana